Torsten Pettersson (born 9 July 1955) is a Finnish-Swedish author, poet and professor.

Born in Turku, Finland, Pettersson lives in Uppsala, Sweden where he works as a professor of literature at Uppsala University. In 1982 he graduated from Åbo Academy with a work about Joseph Conrad.
He has also been professor in literature and aesthetics at Helsingfors University and in 1994 he started working as professor in Uppsala full time.

Bibliography
1982 – Consciousness and time – a study in the philosophy and narrative technique of Joseph Conrad
1983 – Åbo akademi forskar Pågående projekt 1983. Red. Torsten Pettersson
1985 – Besvärjelse
1986 – Att söka sanningen : en grundprincip i Eyvind Johnsons författarskap
1987 – Ser du dem inte?
1989 – Solen är en tunnel
1991 – Vargskallen och andra berättelser
1994 – Livets namn är alltid
1999 – Det finns inget annat
1999 – Litteratur och verklighetsförståelse – idémässiga aspekter av 1900-talets litteratur. Redaktörer: Anders Pettersson, Torsten Pettersson och Anders Tyrberg
2000 – Tid och evighet – nedslag i det gångna årtusendets europeiska litteratur. Red. av Stefan Mählqvist och Torsten Pettersson
2001 – Gåtans namn – tankens och känslans mönster hos nio finlandssvenska modernister (Atlantis)
2001 – Modernitetens ansikten – livsåskådningar i nordisk 1900-talslitteratur. Red.: Carl Reinhold Bråkenhielm och Torsten Pettersson
2002 – Dolda principer : kultur- och litteraturteoretiska studier
2002 – Varje dag
2003 – Att fånga världen i ord – litteratur och livsåskådning – teoretiska perspektiv. Redaktörer: Carl Reinhold Bråkenhielm och Torsten Pettersson
2004 – Det mesta som finns är osynligt
2005 – Mörkret, det börjar, glansen, den varar – en diktsvit (Söderström)
2006 – Operavärldar från Monteverdi till Gershwin – tjugo uppsatser redigerade av Torsten Pettersson
2007 – Att tolka det tomma – om figurativt inriktade tolkningar av det nonfigurativa i bildkonst, litteratur och musik – Konstverk och konstverkan (S. [9]–31)
2007 – Jag ser en stjärna – ett diktat porträtt av Carl von Linné (Edition Edda)
2008 – Ge mig dina ögon (Söderströms)
2010 – Göm mig i ditt hjärta (Söderströms)
2013 – Hitlers fiender : Berlin oktober 1938–januari 1939

References

Living people
1955 births
Swedish writers
Åbo Akademi University alumni
Uppsala University alumni
Academic staff of the University of Helsinki
Academic staff of Uppsala University
Finnish expatriates in Sweden
Finnish writers in Swedish